Semakaleng Mokgadi Moema (born 4 November 1984) is a British Labour Party politician who has been the London Assembly Member for North East since 2021.

Early life
Moema was born in Islington to South African parents who had fled Apartheid in the 1970s. She attended St Michael's Catholic Grammar School and Mahindra United World College. She graduated with a Bachelor of Arts from Keele University and a Master of Science in Public Policy and Management from Birkbeck, University of London.

Political career 
She was first elected as a councillor on Hackney Council for Hackney Downs ward in 2006. She did not stand for re-election in the 2010 local government elections but returned to Hackney Council in a by-election 2016, again representing Hackney Downs ward.  Sem was re-elected in the 2018 Hackney London Borough Council election and in the 2022 Hackney Borough Council election.

Sem is a mayoral adviser for private rented sector and housing affordability on Hackney Council, in which role she introduced a licensing scheme for privately rented housing in Hackney.

Following her election to the London Assembly in May 2021 she was elected to serve on the Assembly's Housing, Police and Crime and Confirmation Hearings Committees. Sem is also the chair of the London Assembly's housing committee.

References 

Living people
21st-century British women politicians
Alumni of Birkbeck, University of London
Alumni of Keele University
Black British women politicians
Councillors in the London Borough of Hackney
English people of South African descent
Labour Members of the London Assembly
People from Islington (district)
1984 births
People from Hackney, London
Women councillors in England